Bad Doberan is a former district in Mecklenburg-Vorpommern, Germany. It was named after its largest town, Bad Doberan, the German Bad meaning spa. The district surrounded the City of Rostock, bordering the Baltic Sea in the north as well as the former districts of Nordvorpommern, Güstrow and Nordwestmecklenburg. The district was disbanded at the district reform of September 2011. Its territory has been part of the district of Rostock since.

History 
Before 500 AD East Germanic tribes dominated the area, who later on emigrated to the west. The then very rural region was thereafter scarcely populated by Slavic peoples until the 12th century. Remains of a Slavic castle can be found in the town of Rerik (which still bears a Slavic name). In 1160 Henry the Lion conquered the region; afterwards German monks, peasants and traders arrived to settle here. In the Middle Ages the region profited from the vicinity of the wealthy Hanseatic city of Rostock. The worst time in regional history was the Thirty Years' War, which depopulated the area almost completely.

In 1793 the bathing resort of Heiligendamm (today a borough of Bad Doberan) was established, and the region became a summer residence for the dukes of Mecklenburg-Schwerin.

In 1952 the districts of Bad Doberan and Rostock-Land were established. They were merged in 1994 in order to form the enlarged district of Bad Doberan. This district was merged with the district of Güstrow at the district reform of September 2011, forming the new district of Rostock.

Geography 
The district comprised a 62 km coastline along the Baltic Sea and its hinterland on both banks of the Warnow river. The Warnow enters the district in the south and leaves to the city of Rostock. Rostock was surrounded by the district, but not part of it.

Coat of arms

Towns and municipalities 
The subdivisions of the district were (situation August 2011):

References

External links 

Official website (German)
Regional Tourist Center for Bad Doberan and surrounding Area (D) (English, German, Dutch)

Rostock (district)